The 2012 Preakness Stakes was the 137th running of the Preakness Stakes thoroughbred horse race. The race took place on May 19, 2012, and was televised in the United States on the NBC television network.  The post time was  EDT ( UTC). I'll Have Another won the second leg of the Triple Crown, narrowly defeating Bodemeister in a last-furlong push.

The Maryland Jockey Club report a record crowd of 121,309, the second highest attendance for American thoroughbred racing events in North America during 2012.

I'll Have Another became the 33rd horse to win the Kentucky Derby and Preakness Stakes double.

Payout 
The 137th Preakness Payout Schedule

 $2 Exacta: (9–7) paid $18.60
 $2 Trifecta: (9–7–6)  paid $70.80
 $1 Superfecta: (9–7–6–4) paid $424.30

The full chart 

The post draw was televised on the Horse Racing TeleVision network (HRTV) on May 17, 2012 at EDT.

Both the winner of the 2012 Kentucky Derby, I'll Have Another and the second placed horse Bodemeister entered the race. Also back from the Derby were fourth-place finisher Went the Day Well and fifth-place finisher Creative Cause, as well as Daddy Nose Best, who placed tenth, and Optimizer, who took 11th at the Derby.

Bodemeister was the 8/5 morning-line favorite and I'll Have Another was the 5/2 second choice.

Kent Desormeaux the original named rider of Tiger Walk was removed after failing a breathalyzer test in New York and replaced by Ramon Dominguez.

 Winning Breeder: Harvey Clarke; (KY)
 Final Time – 1:55:94
 Track – Fast
 Attendance - 121,309

See also
 2012 Kentucky Derby
 2012 Belmont Stakes

References 

Preakness Stakes races
Preakness Stakes
Preakness Stakes
Preakness Stakes
Horse races in Maryland